Mtendere Mandowa, better known by his stage name Teebs, is an American record producer and visual artist from Los Angeles, California. He is a member of the My Hollow Drum collective. He is also one half of the duo Sons of the Morning.

Life and career 
Born in The Bronx, Mandowa was raised by parents from Malawi and Barbados.

Teebs released his first album, Ardour, on Brainfeeder in 2010. LA Weekly called it "one of the most delicate and lovely albums of the year". It was followed by a compilation album, Collections 01, released on Brainfeeder in 2011.

In 2013, Sons of the Morning, his collaborative project with Prefuse 73, released the debut EP, Speak Soon Volume One, on Yellow Year Records. In 2014, Teebs released his second studio album, Estara, on Brainfeeder.

Style and influences 
Teebs' style has been referred to as "beat music", a style which involves recording, layering, altering and organizing several sounds including harps, shakers, drum taps and even tape peeling.

Discography

Studio albums 
 Ardour (2010)
 Estara (2014)
 Anicca (2019)

Compilation albums 
 Collections 01 (2011)

EPs 
 The Tropics EP (2010) (with Jackhigh)
 Los Angeles 6/10 (2010) (with Daedelus)
 Speak Soon Volume One (2013) (with Prefuse 73, as Sons of the Morning)

Singles 
 "Why Like This?" (2010)

Productions 
 Captain Murphy - "The Prisoner" from Duality (2012)

Remixes 
 Populous with Short Stories - "Only Hope (Teebs Remix)" from Remixed in Basic (2010)
 Nosaj Thing - "Caves (Teebs Remix)" from Drift Remixed (2010)
 Exile - "So We Can Move (Teebs Remix)" from Radio Bonus (2010)
 Oscar McClure  - "Teebs' Never Repeat It Mix" from Compost (2010)
 Flying Lotus - "Archway (Teebs Remix)" from Cosmogramma Alt Takes (2011)
 Shlohmo - "Wen Uuu (Teebs Remix)" from Vacation: Remixes (2012)
 Hundred Waters - "Boreal (Teebs Remix)" from Boreal Remix EP (2013)

References

External links 
 
 

American hip hop record producers
Living people
Musicians from Los Angeles
American people of Malawian descent
American people of Barbadian descent
American artists
African-American artists
1987 births
Record producers from California
21st-century African-American people
20th-century African-American people